Jon Weber is an American politician and businessman serving as a member of the Idaho House of Representatives from the 34th district. He assumed office on December 1, 2020.

Early life and education
Weber was raised in Michigan. He studied business at Ricks College and Utah State University, but did not earn a degree.

Career
Weber has owned and operated several businesses and served as chairman of the Madison County Commission. He was elected to the Idaho House of Representatives in November 2020, succeeding Doug Ricks.

References 

Living people
Republican Party members of the Idaho House of Representatives
Year of birth missing (living people)
21st-century American politicians